Sarafu Fatiaki (born 26 July 1990) is a Fijian rugby league footballer who played for the Penrith Panthers in the National Rugby League.

Playing career
Fatiaki made his NRL debut against Parramatta in round two of the 2011 NRL season. Fatiaki's junior club was the St Clair Comets and despite not playing any representative football, earned his call up through strong performances.

After coming off-contract with the Penrith Panthers in 2012, he later played for the Redcliffe Dolphins in the Queensland Cup. He later retired after the 2014 season.

Fatiaki played for Fiji against Italy in 2012.

Post playing
After leaving Dolphins, Fatiaki decided to focus on his passion projects – raising a family and financially supporting his long time friend Shannon Karaka.

In recent years, Sarafu has been dipping his toes into competitive CrossFit. Having trained with team no sleep throughout the 2019 Christmas period, his endurance is in peak condition. Often listed as a top contender and mentoring many up and comers, such as protege Zevrett Vaurasi, Sarafu will definitely be one to watch in 2020.

References

External links
NRL profile

1990 births
Living people
Fijian rugby league players
Penrith Panthers players
Fijian people of Rotuman descent
Redcliffe Dolphins players
Rugby league locks
Windsor Wolves players
Sportspeople from Suva